Josip "Beli" Brezovec (born 12 March 1986) is a Croatian professional footballer who plays as a defensive midfielder for NK Polet.

Club career
Brezovac was born Varaždin. His home club was NK Nedeljanec but as a 10-year-old Brezovec joined NK Varteks and played there until leaving the junior experience in winter 2004–05.

As a junior, he did not manage to enter into the first team at Varteks, so he returned to his home club Nedeljanec. Then he went to the Austrian Regionalliga (Club St. Michael). After a short time in Austria, he returned in Croatia in the summer of 2006. He signed a contract with the Croatian second division club NK Belišće.

In November 2010, it was announced that Brezovec agreed on terms with Dinamo Zagreb and will be transferred out of NK Varaždin (new name of the Varteks) in the mid-season for undisclosed fee. He signed a four-and-a-half-year contract. However, after playing only nine games for Dinamo by the end of season, Brezovec was signed by Slaven Belupo. In June 2012, Brezovec was signed by HNK Rijeka. With ten assists to his account, he was the league leader in the 2012–13 season. In September 2014, Brezovec was loaned to Spezia Calcio in Italy's Serie B. In January 2016, he returned to Rijeka, where he played for the remainder of the 2015–16 season. On 2 July 2016, it was announced that Brezovec was signed by FC Sheriff Tiraspol for a fee of €250,000.

On 19 November 2018, Brezovec joined Croatian First Football League side Inter Zaprešić.

On 23 June 2019, Brezovec joined Croatian Third Football League side NK Polet.

Career statistics

Honours
Dinamo Zagreb
Prva HNL: 2010–11
Croatian Cup: 2011

Rijeka
Prva HNL runner-up (4): 2012–13, 2013–14, 2014–15, 2015–16
Croatian Cup: 2014
Croatian Super Cup: 2014

Sheriff Tiraspol
Moldovan National Division: 2016–17
Moldovan Cup: 2017
Moldovan Super Cup: 2016, 2017

References

External links

1986 births
Living people
People from Vidovec
Association football midfielders
Croatian footballers
Croatia under-21 international footballers
NK Belišće players
NK Varaždin players
GNK Dinamo Zagreb players
NK Slaven Belupo players
HNK Rijeka players
HNK Rijeka II players
Spezia Calcio players
FC Sheriff Tiraspol players
NK Inter Zaprešić players
Croatian Football League players
Serie B players
Moldovan Super Liga players
First Football League (Croatia) players
Second Football League (Croatia) players
Croatian expatriate footballers
Expatriate footballers in Italy
Expatriate footballers in Moldova
Croatian expatriate sportspeople in Italy
Croatian expatriate sportspeople in Moldova